The R550 road is a regional road in Ireland, located on the Dingle Peninsula, County Kerry.

References

Regional roads in the Republic of Ireland
Roads in County Kerry